Conobea is a genus of flowering plants belonging to the family Plantaginaceae.

Its native range is Southern Mexico to Tropical America.

Species:

Conobea aquatica 
Conobea punctata 
Conobea scoparioides

References

Plantaginaceae
Plantaginaceae genera